Northeast Early College High School is a public, co-educational secondary school in Austin, Texas. It is part of the Austin Independent School District. Northeast High School opened in 1965 and was originally named for John Henninger Reagan, a 19th-century U.S. Senator from Texas and the postmaster general of the Confederate States of America. Northeast High School was renamed before the 2019-2020 school year.

Athletics 
For the first two decades of its existence, Reagan High School hosted a highly successful football program. Under coaches Travis Raven, Carroll Lundin and Wally Freytag, the Reagan Raiders formed a dynasty in Texas high school football from 1967 to 1994. In 1967, 1968 and 1970 the Raiders won Texas State Championships as well as being declared National Champions by then-US President Richard M. Nixon in 1970. In 1986, Donald Carr was the quarterback of a Semi Finalist playoff run in the Texas State Championships.

The program experienced another resurgence in football from 1998 to 2003 under head coach Andrew Jackson culminating with the Raiders losing to Bay City in the 2001 state semi-final game. From 2008 through 2010, Reagan High School experienced a significant resurgence in sports, going to the playoffs in consecutive years in basketball, having four students finish tops in wrestling, and the track team for boys and girls performing as one of the top teams in state.

Music Program 
Early in June, 1965, members from thirteen local and out-of-town bands, working with Northeast's first band director R.B. Hunger, formed the first 4A Raider Band. Early hours, hard practice and determination preceded the band's first public performance as the official Austin Aqua Festival Band. Two concerts, one for the dedication of John H. Reagan High School and another for the Texas School Administrators and School Board Convention, kicked off a colorful marching season topped by a Division I Rating in the early November marching contest. Long before Christmas, band members began preparations for U.I.L. solo and ensemble contest. Their diligence paid off in fifty-six Division I ratings. Immediately, work was begun on the remaining activities: a spring concert, a school-wide assembly, concert contest, awards day and finally, graduation ceremonies.  The year ended successfully with a Division I in concert and, as Mr. Hunger said, we had a band that could sight-read like no other! From pep rallies to planting the flower bed to rivalry with the RR's, the first Raider Band showed a spirit and loyalty which proved them to be truly "NOT WITHOUT HONOR". Notes by Susan Osborn 

The Northeast choir traditionally ended choir concerts, graduation and other school events by singing "The Lord Bless you and Keep you", by Peter Lutkin. This tradition began with Northeast's first choir director, Jim Sheppard.

Archival footage of the school’s marching band, performing in a 1969 parade in honor of Apollo 11 astronaut Neil Armstrong, is seen during the closing credits of 
Operation Avalanche, a 2016 film built on the premise of faking the Moon landing portion of the Apollo 11 mission.

Notable alumni 

Reggie Brown, Detroit Lions Linebacker; graduated 1992
Brendan Christian, Olympian Sprinter, graduated 2002
Dawnna Dukes, Texas State Representative; graduated 1981
Bill Greif, San Diego Padres pitcher; graduated 1968
Donna Howard, Texas State Representative; graduated 1969
Ron Kirk, U.S. Trade Representative; Former Mayor of Dallas; graduated 1972
Austin Ligon, Co-Founder and retired CEO of CarMax; graduated 1969
General Mark Welsh, Chief of Staff, United States Air Force, graduated 1971
Johnny Kleinert, 1967 Class 4A All-State Football, halfback, Texas Sports Writers Association 
 Ray Dowdy, 1967 Class 4A football championship, All-American, Defensive Lineman; Tyler Junior College National Championship football team; 1969 & 1970 UT Longhorns National Championship Team; 1971 ALL-Southwest Conference; 1970-71 UT Letterwinner.
 Viet Nguyen, editor/director known for iZombie

References

External links 
 Official John H. Reagan Class of 1974 Website
 Official John H. Reagan Website
Official AISD Website
 Schooldigger Entry on Reagan High
 Official John H. Reagan Class of 1968 website
 Scope (Reagan High School Media Television Production from 1994) on Texas Archive of the Moving Image

Educational institutions established in 1965
High schools in Austin, Texas
Austin Independent School District high schools
1965 establishments in Texas